Jordan is divided into three regions, further into twelve governorates (muhafatha), further subdivided into districts (liwa), and often into sub-districts (qada).

1994 reform
In 1994, four new governorates were created as part of the administrative divisions system of the Ministry of Interior: Jerash, Ajloun, Madaba and Aqaba. Jerash Governorate and Ajloun Governorate were split from Irbid Governorate, Madaba Governorate was split from Amman Governorate and Aqaba Governorate was split from Ma'an Governorate.

Geographical regions vs. metropolitan areas
Geographically, the governorates of Jordan are located in one of three regions (aqalim): the North Region, Central Region and the South Region. The three geographical regions are not distributed by area or populations, but rather by geographical connectivity and distance among the population centres. The South Region is separated from the Central Region by the Mountains of Moab in Karak Governorate. The population centres of the Central and North Region are separated geographically by the mountains of Jerash Governorate.

Socially, the population centres of Amman, Salt, Zarqa and Madaba form together one large metropolitan area in which business interactions in these cities are under the influence of Amman, while the cities of Jerash, Ajloun, and Mafraq are mostly under the influence of the city of Irbid.

The 12 governorates

See also
 Nahias of Jordan
 List of cities in Jordan
List of Jordanian governorates by Human Development Index
 ISO 3166-2:JO

References

 
Subdivisions of Jordan
Jordan, Governorates
Jordan 1
Governorates, Jordan
Jordan geography-related lists
Jordan